Microlepidogaster is a genus of armored catfishes native to South America.

Species
There are currently 7 recognized species in this genus:
 Microlepidogaster arachas Martins, Calegari & Langeani, 2013 
 Microlepidogaster bourguyi A. Miranda-Ribeiro, 1911
 Microlepidogaster dimorpha Martins & Langeani, 2011
 Microlepidogaster discontenta Calegari, E. V. Silva & R. E. dos Reis, 2014 
 Microlepidogaster discus Martins, A. C. Rosa & Langeani, 2014 
 Microlepidogaster longicolla Calegari & R. E. dos Reis, 2010
 Microlepidogaster perforatus C. H. Eigenmann & R. S. Eigenmann, 1889

References

Otothyrinae
Fish of South America
Catfish genera
Taxa named by Carl H. Eigenmann
Taxa named by Rosa Smith Eigenmann
Freshwater fish genera